M. S. Narayana (16 April 1951–23 January 2015) was an Indian actor and comedian who worked in Telugu cinema. Narayana worked in over 750 films in his career spanning 23 years. He died on 23 January 2015 due to organ failure in Hyderabad, India.

Career
Narayana's debut film as an actor is Pedarayudu which was released in 1995. Narayana dabbled in theatre initially while working as a lecturer at KGRL College, Bhimavaram, and entered the film industry as a writer before being introduced as an actor.

Awards and honors 
Narayana won five Nandi Awards presented by Andhra Pradesh Government as Best Male Comedian. He made his debut as a director in the film Koduku starring his son Vikram. Another film directed by him was Bhajantrilu. He penned dialogues for eight films.

Guinness record
Narayana became very popular for his comedian roles in Tollywood. During the promotion of Dileep Kumar and Priyal Gor starrer film Saheba Subramanyam, he claimed that he started his career in 1997, at the age of 46. Since then, he has acted in over 700 films in a short period of just 17 years. His friends appealed to the Guinness Records Academy to recognise him.

Filmography

Awards and nominations

Nandi Awards
 Best Male Comedian - Maa Nannaki Pelli (1997)
 Best Male Comedian - Ramsakkanodu (1999)
 Best Male Comedian - Sardukupodaam Randi (2000)
 Best Male Comedian - Sivamani (2003)
 Best Male Comedian - Dookudu (2011)

Filmfare Awards South
 Best Supporting Actor – Telugu - Dookudu (2011)

CineMAA Awards
 Best Actor (Jury) - Dookudu (2011)

References

External links
 

2015 deaths
Indian male comedians
Indian male film actors
1951 births
Telugu comedians
20th-century Indian male actors
21st-century Indian male actors
Male actors from Andhra Pradesh
Male actors in Telugu cinema
People from West Godavari district